Evelyn Mary Sutton ( Breakell, 14 September 1906 – 19 December 1992), commonly known as Eve Sutton, was a New Zealand writer of literature for children.

Early life and family
Evelyn Mary Breakell was born in Preston, Lancashire, England, on 14 September 1906. She worked as a primary school teacher from 1927 to 1931, when she married Arthur Sutton at Christ Church, Fulwood, Preston. In 1949, the family migrated to New Zealand, and Eve Sutton became a naturalised New Zealand citizen in 1955.

Writing career
Sutton's first children's book, My Cat Likes to Hide in Boxes, was written after her cousin by marriage, Lynley Dodd, suggested that they collaborate on a book; Sutton wrote the text and Dodd provided the illustrations. Now regarded as a New Zealand classic, it was Sutton's only picture book, and it received the Esther Glen Award in 1975.

Subsequently, Sutton went on to write books for older children, including a series of novels about the experiences of immigrants to New Zealand. In 1990, she was awarded the New Zealand Children's Literature Association's Award for Services to Children's Literature.

Death
Sutton died on 19 December 1992, and her body was cremated at Purewa Crematorium, Auckland.

Books
1973 — My Cat Likes to Hide in Boxes
1976 — Green Gold
1977 — Johnny Sweep
1977 — Tuppenny Brown
1978 — Moa Hunter
1983 — Surgeon's Boy
1983 — Skip for the Huntaway
1984 — Kidnapped by Blackbirders
1987 — Valley of Heavenly Gold

References

1906 births
1992 deaths
Schoolteachers from Preston, Lancashire
English emigrants to New Zealand
New Zealand children's writers
New Zealand women children's writers